Cornel Oțelea (born 19 November 1940) is a former Romanian handball player who won the World Championships three times.

Biography
He has won three world titles, the European Champions Cup as a player (1968) and coach (1977), both with Steaua București. He was a coach of the Romania men's national handball team (bronze medal at the 1990 World Men's Handball Championship), and since 2008 he has coached the Steaua Bucharest men's handball team.

Colonel Cornel Oțelea from the Ministry of National Defense was promoted to the rank of brigadier general (with one star), being subsequently transferred to the reserve on December 31, 1997. In 2009, he was decorated with the Order of Sports Merit cl. Takes.

See also
 World Championships most winner players
 CSA Steaua București (handball)

References

External links
 Cornel Oțelea at EU aleg România 

1940 births
Living people
Romanian male handball players
People from Sibiu County
Presidents of the Romanian Handball Federation